Louise Norman Hansen (born 12 February 1995) is a Danish racing cyclist, who most recently rode for Belgian amateur team . She is the sister of racing cyclist Lasse Norman Hansen.

Major results
2017
3rd Time trial, National Road Championships
2019
1st  Time trial, National Road Championships

See also
 List of 2016 UCI Women's Teams and riders

References

External links
 

1995 births
Living people
Danish female cyclists
People from Faaborg-Midtfyn Municipality
Sportspeople from the Region of Southern Denmark
21st-century Danish women